XHUI-FM is a radio station on 99.1 FM in Comitán de Domínguez, Chiapas. The station is owned by Radio Núcleo and carries its Extremo Grupero grupera format.

History
XHUI began as XEUI-AM 1320, with a concession awarded on October 28, 1963. It was owned by Fernando Balderas Rodríguez and broadcast with 1,000 watts.

In June 1968, the station was sold to Celia María Amador Carrillo de Partida. In 1997, ownership passed to a corporation, and in the early 2000s XEUI moved to 800 and increased its power to 5,000 watts. XEUI was cleared to migrate to FM in 2010.

References

Radio stations in Chiapas
Radio stations established in 1963